is a railway station on the Chūō-Sōbu Line in Shibuya, Tokyo, Japan, operated by East Japan Railway Company (JR East).

Lines
Sendagaya Station is served by Chūō-Sobu Line local services.

Station layout
The station consists of an island platform serving eastbound trains and a side platform serving westbound trains.

Platforms

History
The station opened on 21 August 1904.

In September 1964, a third temporary platform was constructed across from the existing island platform to separate passengers on westbound trains and eastbound trains to reduce overcrowding during the 1964 Summer Olympics. The third temporary platform has remained closed after the 1964 Games, but the plan was announced in 2016 to renovate the station and to convert the temporary platform to a permanent westbound platform in time for the 2020 Summer Olympics.

In March 2020, the renovation of the station and the conversion of the temporary platform was completed with the addition of new escalators, elevator and platform edge doors.

Passenger statistics
In fiscal 2011, the station was used by an average of 20,008 passengers daily (boarding passengers only).

The passenger figures for previous years are as shown below.

Surrounding area

Located in front of the station is Kokuritsu Kyogijo Station on the Toei Ōedo Line.
Sendagaya is an important center for culture and sporting venues.
Shinjuku Gyoen 
Olympic Stadium, Tokyo
Tokyo Metropolitan Gymnasium
National Noh Theatre
Hato-no-Mori Hachiman Shrine

References

External links

 Sendagaya Station information (JR East) 

Railway stations in Japan opened in 1904
Chūō-Sōbu Line
Stations of East Japan Railway Company
Railway stations in Tokyo